SS Eubee was a French steam passenger ship built in 1921.

The collision left Eubee with her engine room flooded, and five stokers killed. Corinaldo took off her passengers. Eubee was taken in tow by the Brazilian tugboat  and the Uruguayan tugboat , but foundered on 16 August 1936. Her crew were rescued by Antonio Azambuja.

References

External links
 
 *  
 

1921 ships
Maritime incidents in 1936
Ocean liners
Ships sunk in collisions
Shipwrecks in the Atlantic Ocean
Steamships of France